Andrija is the South Slavic variant of Greek Andreas (Andrew). It may refer to:

Andrija Stipanović, basketballer
Andrija Žižić (born 1980), Croatian basketballer
Andrija Kaluđerović (born 1987), Serbian footballer
Andrija Pavlović (born 1993), Serbian footballer
Andrija Dragojević (born 1991), Montenegrin footballer
Andrija Vuković, handballer
Andrija Anković (1937–1980), Yugoslav footballer and manager
Andrija Puharich (1918-1995), medical and parapsychological researcher
Andrija Balić (born 1997), Croatian footballer
Andrija Milošević (born 1978), Serbian actor and television host
Andrija, Prince of Hum (fl. 1203–50)
Andrija Zmajević (1628-1694), Serbian-Venetian Baroque poet
Andrija Medulić
Andrija Paltašić (1440–1500), Venetian printer
Andrija Popović (born 1959), Montenegrin politician and former water polo goalkeeper
Andrija Kačić Miošić (1704–1760), Croatian poet and Franciscan friar
Andrija Prlainović (born 1987), Serbian water polo player
Andrija Luković (born 1994), Serbian footballer
Andrija Majdevac (born 1997), Serbian footballer
Andrija Novakovich (born 1996), American professional soccer player
Andrija Mohorovičić (1857–1936), Croatian meteorologist and seismologist
Andrija Ratković (born 1997), Serbian footballer
Andrija Gerić (born 1977),
Andrija Zlatić (born 1978), Serbian sports shooter
Andrija Jukic (born 1987), Australian footballer
Andrija Delibašić (born 1981), Montenegrin retired footballer
Andrija Artuković (1899–1988), Croatian lawyer, politician and nationalist
Andrija Simović (born 1995), Serbian basketballer
Andrija Balajić (born 1972), Croatian footballer
Andrija Bojić (born 1993), Serbian basketballer
Andrija Živković (born 1996), Serbian footballer
Andrija Maurović (1901–1981), Yugoslav comics artist
Andrija Ljudevit Adamić (1766–1828), Austrian-Croatian merchant
Andrija Hebrang (father) (1899–1949), Yugoslav communist politician
Andrija Mandić (born 1965), Montenegrin politician
Andrija Radović (1872-1947) Yugoslav politician
Andrija Štampar (1888–1958), Yugoslav
Andrija Fuderer (1931–2011), Croatian–Belgian
Andrija Aleši (1425–1505), Venetian Dalmatian architect and sculptor
Andrija Buvina (13th century), Croatian sculptor and painter
Andrija Dudić (1533-1589), 
Andrija Jankovic, Serbian rugby union player
Andrija Radulović (poet) (born 1970), Montenegrin poet
Andrija Gropa, Serbian nobleman
Andrija Panic, Serbian rugby union player
Andrija Lompar (born 1956), Montenegrin politician
Andrija Šimić (1833–1905), hajduk
Andrija Ojdanić, Serbian pop-folk singer
Andrija Novosel (born 1993), Slovenian footballer
Andrija Knego (born 1956), Croatian basketball
Andrija Kojić

See also
Sveti Andrija (disambiguation) ("Saint Andrew")
Andreja

Serbian masculine given names
Croatian masculine given names